The Warwickshire Women's cricket team is the women's representative cricket team for the English historic county of Warwickshire. They play their home games at Edgbaston Foundation Sports Ground, Birmingham, and are captained by Marie Kelly. In 2019, they won the Women's Twenty20 Cup. They are partnered with the regional side Central Sparks.

History

1937–2000: Early History
Warwickshire Women played their first recorded match in 1937, against Australia, which they lost by 7 wickets. Warwickshire went on to play various one-off matches, including regular matches against Surrey. Meanwhile, West Midlands Women, which included players from Warwickshire, joined the Women's Area Championship in 1980, and played in the competition until it ended in 1996, upon which they joined the Women's County Championship.

2001– : Women's County Championship
Warwickshire Women replaced West Midlands Women in the County Championship in 2001, and finished 4th in Division 3 in their first season. Warwickshire played in the lower tiers of the Championship in the early years of the competition, before making their way up the divisions, beginning with their promotion from the County Challenge Cup in 2006, followed by promotions from Division Three in 2007 and Division Two in 2012. Ever since, Warwickshire have played in Division 1, with their highest finish of 3rd coming in both 2016 and 2017. 

Warwickshire joined the Women's Twenty20 Cup for its inaugural season in 2009. The team rapidly improved in recent years, being promoted from Division 2 in 2015, then finishing 2nd in Division 1 in 2016. In 2019, Warwickshire won Division 1, topping the league with 5 wins from 8 to be crowned Champions. Captain Marie Kelly was their star batter, ending the season as the division's leading run-scorer. Key contributions also came from wicket-keeper Gwenan Davies and bowlers Jessica Couser and Bethan Ellis. In 2021, the Twenty20 Cup was regionalised (and the County Championship discontinued), with Warwickshire competing in the West Midlands Group. They finished 2nd in the group, going unbeaten with 4 wins and 4 matches abandoned. They topped their group in the 2022 Women's Twenty20 Cup, before beating Somerset in the group final on Finals Day. Warwickshire bowler Anisha Patel was the leading wicket-taker across the whole competition, with 15 wickets. They also competed in the West Midlands Regional Cup in 2022, as a "consortium" team with Shropshire, finishing third.

Players

Current squad
Based on appearances in the 2022 season.  denotes players with international caps.

West Midlands Regional Cup squad
In 2022, Warwickshire competed in the West Midlands Regional Cup. The side played under the Warwickshire name, but included players from both Warwickshire and Shropshire, in a "consortium" arrangement. Players who made an appearance in the tournament for Warwickshire are listed below. Players listed as "dual-registered" appeared for both Warwickshire and Shropshire in the 2022 Women's Twenty20 Cup.  denotes players with international caps.

Notable players
Players who have played for Warwickshire and played internationally are listed below, in order of first international appearance (given in brackets):

 Muriel Haddelsey (1937)
 Rachael Heyhoe Flint (1960)
 June Bragger (1963)
 Rosemary Goodchild (1966)
 Lisa Keightley (1995)
 Zehmarad Afzal (2000)
 Jenny Gunn (2004)
 Sophie Devine (2006)
 Violet Wattenberg (2007)
 Delissa Kimmince (2008)
 Amy Jones (2013)
 Rebecca Grundy (2014)
 Sarah Aley (2017)
 Kathryn Bryce (2018)
 Christina Gough (2019)
 Issy Wong (2022)

Seasons

Women's County Championship

Women's Twenty20 Cup

Honours
 County Championship:
 Division Two Champions (1) – 2012
 Division Three Champions (1) – 2007
 Women's Twenty20 Cup:
 Champions (1) – 2019
 Division Two Champions (1) – 2015
 Group winners (1) – 2022

See also
 Warwickshire County Cricket Club
 Central Sparks

References

Cricket in Warwickshire
Women's cricket teams in England